Elections to the Labour Party's Shadow Cabinet took place in July 1992. Shadow Cabinet elections generally take place at the beginning of a parliamentary session, but the 1992 vote was postponed until a new leader  was elected to replace Neil Kinnock. Under the rules then in effect, the Commons members of the Parliamentary Labour Party elected 18 members of the Official Opposition Shadow Cabinet, who were then assigned portfolios by the leader. The Commons members of the PLP separately elected the Chief Whip, and the Labour peers elected the Leader of the Opposition in the House of Lords. In addition, the Leader of the Labour Party and Deputy Leader (John Smith and Margaret Beckett, respectively) were members by virtue of those offices. The 18 elected members of the Shadow Cabinet were the ones with the largest number of votes, except that the three women with the most votes would be included in the 18, even if they were not among the top 18 based on the number of votes.

† Multiple candidates tied for position.

References

1992
1992 elections in the United Kingdom
July 1992 events in the United Kingdom